One Georgia Center (also known as the Life of Georgia Building) is a skyscraper in SoNo, Atlanta, at the intersection of West Peachtree Street and North Avenue. Completed in 1968, the 24-story building is notable for its Georgia marble exterior.

History 
One Georgia Center was built in 1968, originally as the headquarters for the Life of Georgia Insurance Company. While initially planned as a 29-story building, upon completion the building topped out at 24 stories, with a construction cost of $13.5 million. Originally, the building was capped by a large sign for Life of Georgia, though this has since been removed. According to the American Institute of Architects, the building is notable for being one of the first skyscrapers built in Atlanta outside of downtown Atlanta, precipitating a steady growth in midtown Atlanta's skyline. In 2011, Cousins Properties sold the building for $48.6 million.

References

External links 
 

Skyscrapers in Georgia (U.S. state)
Buildings and structures completed in 1968
1968 establishments in Georgia (U.S. state)